Robert Burns (December 12, 1792 – June 26, 1866) was an American and a U.S. Representative from New Hampshire.

Early life
Born in Hudson, New Hampshire, Burns moved with his parents in childhood to Rumney in Grafton County. He studied medicine with Dr. Ezra Bartlett in Warren, New Hampshire, taught school, then attended Dartmouth Medical School in 1815.

Career
Burns returned to Warren to help with people hit with spotted fever and commenced the practice of medicine. He moved 20 miles south to Hebron in 1818 and continued the practice of his profession until 1835. He became a fellow of the New Hampshire Medical Society in 1824 and served as member of the New Hampshire Senate in 1831.

Elected as a Jacksonian to the Twenty-third and Twenty-fourth Congresses, Burns served as United States Representative for the state of New Hampshire from (March 4, 1833 – March 3, 1837). He continued the practice of medicine in Plymouth, New Hampshire, until his death.

Death
Burns died in Plymouth on June 26, 1866 (age 73 years, 196 days). interred  at the churchyard of Trinity Church, Holderness, New Hampshire.

Family life
Son of George and Anna Adams Burns, he married Mary Merrill on November 6. 1816, and they had three children, Susan, William, and Mary B.
After Mary's death on September 15, 1849, he married Almira Cox and they had two children, Annie S. and Robert.

References

External links

1792 births
1866 deaths
New Hampshire state senators
Geisel School of Medicine alumni
Jacksonian members of the United States House of Representatives from New Hampshire
19th-century American politicians
People from Hudson, New Hampshire
People from Rumney, New Hampshire
People from Lisbon, New Hampshire
People from Warren, New Hampshire